Independence Centre or variation may refer to:

 Independence Center, Independence, Missouri, USA; a shopping mall
 Independence Center (St. Louis), Missouri, USA; a psychiatric rehabilitation center
 Independence Events Center, Independence, Missouri, USA; a multipurpose arena
 Independence Visitor Center, Philadelphia, Pennsylvania, USA
 101 Independence Center, Charlotte, North Carolina, USA; an office building

See also
 Independence Mall (disambiguation)
 Independence Hall (disambiguation)
 Independence Building, several structures
 Independence (disambiguation)
 Centre (disambiguation)